Pierluigi Biondi (born 1 December 1974) is an Italian politician who is member of the Brothers of Italy (FdI). He is married to Elisa Marulli, also a journalist, and has a one daughter. He began his experience as a journalist in the Abruzzo region in 2002 in the staff of Senator Fabrizio Di Stefano. In 2017, he was elected mayor of his hometown of L'Aquila.

References

External links 

 
 
 Pierluigi Biondi at openpolis.it

|-

Living people
1974 births
People from L'Aquila
Brothers of Italy politicians
21st-century Italian politicians
Mayors of places in Abruzzo